Below is a list of foreign ministers of the Republic of Namibia. The respective ministry, named Ministry of Foreign Affairs since independence, was renamed Ministry of International Relations and Cooperation at the start of the 2015–2020 legislative period.

1990–2002: Theo-Ben Gurirab
2002–2004: Hidipo Hamutenya
2004–2010: Marco Hausiku
2010–2012: Utoni Nujoma
2012–present: Netumbo Nandi-Ndaitwah

References

Foreign ministers
Foreign ministers
Foreign
Namibia